Audax is a Latin adjective meaning "bold, daring" and may refer to:

Media 
 Audax Groep, a Dutch media and retail company

Sport

Cycling
Audax (cycling), long-distance endurance bicycle rides
Audax Australia, an organisation that runs long distance randonnee cycling events in Australia and New Zealand
Audax UK, British cycling club that oversees long-distance cycling in the United Kingdom

Football
Audax Italiano, a Chilean football club based in the city of Santiago
Audax Rio de Janeiro Esporte Clube, a Brazilian football club based in the city of São João de Meriti
Grêmio Osasco Audax Esporte Clube, a Brazilian football club based in the city of São Paulo

Transport
Hawker Audax, British, 1930s military aircraft
Rootes Audax, a family of cars made by the British Rootes Group

People
Audax, one of the assassins of the Lusitanian leader Viriathus during the Roman Conquest of Hispania: see Audax, Ditalcus and Minurus
St. Audax, a 3rd-century saint who was martyred with Victoria and Anatolia
Audax, an archbishop of Tarragona (Spain) in c. 633, who assisted to the Fourth Council of Toledo
Audax Minor (1887–1979), racing columnist for The New Yorker
Audax (grammarian), a grammarian of the 5th/6th century